The Tannahill Weavers are a band which performs traditional Scottish music. Releasing their first album in 1976, they became notable for being one of the first popular bands to incorporate the sound of the Great Highland Bagpipe in an ensemble setting, and in doing so helped to change the sound of Scottish traditional music. In 2011 the band were inducted into the Scottish Traditional Music Hall of Fame.

The band was formed in 1968 and practised in a back room of the McKay family's rented council house at 41 St. Ninian's Road, Hunterhill, Paisley. The band first performed at St. Peter's Folk Club, Glenburn, Paisley which was run by Pat Doherty, father of Weavers' founding member Neil Doherty.

As of 2021, they continue to tour and release new recordings. They are named after Scottish poet Robert Tannahill, known as the 'Weaver Poet,'  and have recorded several of his songs.

Members
The current members of the band are:
Roy Gullane (guitar, vocals)
Phil Smillie (flute, tin whistles, bodhrán, vocals)
Malcolm Bushby (fiddle)
Iain MacGillivray (Highland bagpipes, fiddle, Scottish smallpipes, tin whistle)

Past members have included:
Lorne MacDougall (Highland bagpipes, Scottish smallpipes, tin whistle)
John Martin (fiddle, vocals)
Colin Melville (Highland bagpipes, Scottish smallpipes, tin whistles)
Leslie Wilson (bouzouki, keyboards, bass pedals, guitar, vocals)
Alan MacLeod (Highland bagpipes, tin whistles, mandola, organ, vocals)
Bill Bourne (vocals, bouzouki, guitar, electric guitar, fiddle, keyboards, bass pedals)
Dougie MacLean (fiddle, mandolin, vocals, guitar, tenor banjo)
Duncan J. Nicholson (Highland bagpipes, Scottish smallpipes, tin whistles)
Struan Thorpe (Highland bagpipes, Scottish smallpipes, flute, tin whistles, guitar)
Gordon Duncan (Highland bagpipes, tin whistles)
Hudson Swan (bouzouki, vocals, fiddle, glockenspiel, mandolin)
Iain MacInnes  (Highland bagpipes, Scottish smallpipes, tin whistles, vocals)
Kenny Forsyth (Highland bagpipes, Scottish smallpipes, tin whistles)
Mike Ward (fiddle, guitar, vocals)
 Ross Kennedy (bouzouki, fiddle, bass pedals, vocals)
Stuart Morison (fiddles, bones, guitar)
 Willie Beaton (fiddle, vocals)
 David Shaw (guitar, bass guitar)
 Willie Beag (fiddle)
 John Cassidy (whistles, vocals) - founding member
 Stuart McKay (vocals, guitar, penny whistle) - founding member
 Neil Doherty (vocals, guitar, mandolin, penny whistle) - founding member
 Jim McGowan (vocals) - founding member

Timeline

Discography

Albums

Are Ye Sleeping Maggie (1976)
The Old Woman's Dance (1978)
The Tannahill Weavers (1979)
Tannahill Weavers IV (1981)
Passage (1984)
Land of Light (1986)
Dancing Feet (1987)
Best of the Tannahill Weavers 1979 - 1989 (1989)
Cullen Bay (1990)
The Mermaid's Song (1992)
Capernaum (1994)
Leaving St. Kilda (1996)
The Tannahill Weavers Collection: Choice Cuts 1987-1996 (1997)
Epona (1998)
Alchemy (2000)
Arnish Light (2003)
Live and In Session (2006)
Òrach (2018)

Contributing artists
The Rough Guide to Scottish Music (1996)

References

External links
Tannahill Weavers (official site)
MySpace page

Musical groups established in 1968
Scottish folk music groups
Green Linnet Records artists
Compass Records artists